Rama II Road (usually shortened to ) or Highway 35 is a road in Thailand heading towards the south. Rama II Road starts from Chom Thong District in the Thonburi side of Bangkok, passing through Bang Khun Thian District into Samut Sakhon Province. The road is maintained by the Department of Highways.

Rama II Road was built during the government of Field Marshal Thanom Kittikachorn with a total budget of approximately 419 million baht and was officially opened on 1 April 1973. It was named "Rama II" in honor of King Phutthaloetla Naphalai (Rama II) of the Chakri dynasty, who was born in present-day Samut Songkhram Province.

Construction began in mid-1970, divided into 3 phases:

 Thonburi to Samut Sakhon, a distance of 29 km, construction cost 180 million baht
 Samut Sakhon to Samut Songkhram, a distance of 36 km, construction cost 142 million baht
Samut Songkhram to meet Phet Kasem Road at the km 125.5 in area of Amphoe Pak Tho, Ratchaburi Province, distance 19 km, along with Somdet Phra Phutthaloetla Naphalai Bridge, the bridge over Mae Klong River, including construction cost 99 million baht.

Upon its completion, the road became an important travel route which shortened the travel time to the south, bypassing Phet Kasem Road and helping to divert its traffic. A side effect of the road's construction was that the Maeklong Railway line became less frequented and unprofitable, but still could not be retired due to some villages remaining accessible only by train.

References

National highways in Thailand
Streets in Bangkok
1973 establishments in Thailand